Lowestoft North railway station was in Lowestoft, England. It closed in 1970.

The station was located just to the east of the A12, opposite the Denes High School; a site which is now occupied by Beeching Drive.

History
Lowestoft North was opened on 10 July 1903 by the Norfolk and Suffolk Joint Railway as part of its line from Yarmouth to Lowestoft. The station covered a large area and was provided with two long platforms lit by electric lamps in anticipation of large numbers of passengers. The station was located immediately to the north of the Yarmouth Road and comprised imposing station buildings on either side of the tracks, which were connected by a footbridge. On the Down side, there was a spacious goods yard with a weighing machine and cattle pens. The station remained little changed during its lifetime.

Before the line that served this station was built, it was intended for the line to branch off just to the south of Lowestoft North Station to a terminus station called Lowestoft Beach, on the Denes, because the owning company could not obtain powers to take the line into Lowestoft Central Station (then just called Lowestoft Station).  This was resolved and the proposed Lowestoft Beach terminus and branch was never built.

The station became an important coal depot with the line dealing with 20,000 tons of coal a year. It was also a popular location for the movement of troops by the military which had camps nearby on the North Denes and on what is now Corton Road playing field. The March 1908 timetable shows three weekday afternoon/evening services from Lowestoft North to Yarmouth Beach; the journey time was 26 minutes.

The development of holiday camps along the Suffolk coast from the 1930s onwards brought lengthy trains to the Yarmouth-Lowestoft line. Each Saturday during the summer of 1957 the local passenger service was supplemented by two trains to Liverpool Street and four trains bringing passengers in the opposite direction. There was also a service in each direction to Derby and Leicester, plus a through train to York. The station was host to a LNER camping coach from 1935 to 1939. A camping coach was positioned here by the Eastern Region from 1952 to 1965, from 1961 the coach was a Pullman camping coach; they were used as accommodation for holidaymakers.

In September 1966, the line was singled and all intermediate stations became unstaffed halts. From this point onwards, it became a deteriorating ghost line. In the last few years before closure, the line became a long siding providing a skeleton passenger service which was very cheap to run and with no level crossings of any importance. Once staff had been withdrawn, access to the station was via a side gate rather than through the booking hall which was locked out of use. The goods yard closed on 6 November 1967and the next day Lowestoft North signal box also closed, the last Norfolk & Suffolk box still in use at the time. The station closed on 4 May 1970

Present day

After closure of the line, the land in the vicinity of Lowestoft North was purchased for residential development. Housing now completely covers the site, but the memory of the line lives on as the roads have names associated with the railway, such as Beeching Drive.

Part of the original route between Lowestoft Central and Lowestoft North, where the tracks ran mostly below street level in an open cutting, has been made into a non-vehicular public right-of-way known as the Great Eastern Linear Park. After a period during which the line was left unused, overgrown and partially flooded for many years after its closure, a  section between the North Quay Retail Park and Marham Road was made into a cyclepath as part of phase 1 of the scheme which was completed in Spring 1998. The second part of the route as far as Yarmouth Road was completed in Summer 2004 to create a  corridor.

The stationmaster's house has survived nearby on the corner of Station Road in a fairly unchanged state.

References

Notes

Sources

External links
 Lowestoft North station on 1946 O.S. map
 Images of stationmaster's house
 Image of station
 Image of station

Disused railway stations in Suffolk
Former Norfolk and Suffolk Joint Railway stations
Railway stations in Great Britain opened in 1903
Railway stations in Great Britain closed in 1970
Beeching closures in England
Lowestoft